Joseph P. McGuinness (12 April 1875 – 31 May 1922) was an Irish Sinn Féin politician and Member of Parliament (MP) from 1917 until his death in 1922. He is known for winning the South Longford by-election in 1917 while serving a prison sentence for his role in the Easter Rising. Michael Collins worked on his by-election campaign.

Early life
McGuinness was born on 12 April 1875 in Cloonmore townland, Tarmonbarry, County Roscommon, to Martin McGuinness, farmer, and Rose Farrell.

After a period in the United States, he lived in Longford town after his return from the USA in 1902. He became involved in the local Conradh na Gaeilge branch. He subsequently moved to Dublin, where he ran drapery shops. He also joined the Irish Volunteers, serving as a lieutenant in ‘C’ company, 1st battalion, which was commanded by Ned Daly. His wife, Katherine Farrell, was a member of the central branch of Cumann na mBan.

Political career
McGuinness, as a member of the Irish Volunteers, took part in fighting in the Four Courts during the Easter Rising in 1916. According to some reports, he was second-in-command in the Four Courts. After the defeat of the uprising, McGuinness was sentenced to ten years' penal servitude (later reduced to three), and was transferred to HM Prison Lewes with other fighters.

While in prison, McGuinness was selected against his will as Sinn Féin candidate for the Longford South by-election in May 1917. The prisoners in Lewes were opposed to standing a candidate when the Irish Parliamentary Party looked likely to win, so McGuinness declined to stand. However, Collins had him nominated anyway, and McGuinness went on to win by 37 votes after a recount. His election slogan was "Put him in to get him out!"

He was re-elected as MP for the new Longford constituency at the 1918 general election. In common with the other Sinn Féin MPs, he did not take his seat in the British House of Commons, sitting instead as a TD in the revolutionary First Dáil, where he was appointed as substitute Director of Trade and Commerce on 27 October 1919.

He was re-elected unopposed at the 1921 general election in the new Longford–Westmeath constituency; he died before the 1922 general election. He voted in favour of the Anglo-Irish Treaty in January 1922.

At a subsequent election, his seat was taken by his brother Francis McGuinness.

References

External links
 

1875 births
1922 deaths
Early Sinn Féin TDs
Members of the 1st Dáil
Members of the 2nd Dáil
Members of the Parliament of the United Kingdom for County Longford constituencies (1801–1922)
UK MPs 1910–1918
UK MPs 1918–1922
People from County Roscommon
Politicians from County Longford
Prisoners and detainees of the United Kingdom